Eucantharomyces is a genus of fungi in the family Laboulbeniaceae. The genus contain 26 species.

References

External links
Eucantharomyces at Index Fungorum

Laboulbeniomycetes